The false map turtle (Graptemys pseudogeographica) is a species of turtle endemic to the United States. It is a common pet species. Two subspecies are recognized, including the nominotypical subspecies described here.

Description
Also known as a "sawback" turtle, the turtle has a carapace featuring a vertebral row of low spines, and is serrated on the posterior rim. The carapace is olive to brown in color with light yellowish markings with dark borders. The plastron color varies from cream to yellow and is patterned with dark lines along the seams in juveniles. The body color of the false map turtle is grayish brown to blackish and is marked with light brown, yellow, or whitish stripes. The eye can be brown, light yellow, white, or green and is crossed with a dark bar. Narrow hooked marks behind the eye fuse with dorsal lines on the head and neck. Also, small light-colored spots occur below the eye and on the chin.

Geographic range
The false map turtle lives in large streams of the Missouri and Mississippi River systems, ranging from Ohio, Indiana, Illinois, Wisconsin, Minnesota, through the Dakotas southward to southwestern Alabama, southern and western Mississippi, and Louisiana. The false map turtle also lives in several other river systems of Southwest Louisiana and East Texas.

Conservation status
In the Midwest, the false map turtle is a species of special interest in Ohio.

Behavior
Map turtles of all kinds are avid baskers, spending many hours during the day in the sun.  When with other turtles, they also are very communal, sharing space and using each other for predator-watching, increasing the odds of surviving an attack.

Subspecies
 Nominotypical subspecies: G. p. pseudogeographica (Gray, 1831) – False map turtle
 G. p. kohnii (Baur, 1890) – Mississippi map turtle

Ecology
The false map turtle is a strong swimmer and prefers rivers and large creeks with moderate currents, containing aquatic vegetation, as well as snags or floating logs. They are also comfortable in deep and swift water. The turtles are present in oxbow lakes and sloughs, but are absent from lakes, ponds, or small streams. Basking is important to these turtles, and they may even be found on steep, slippery snags.

Threats and management issues 
A variety of threats face this species, including the destruction of nests of eggs by animals and insects, falling victim to gill nets, and being shot. False map turtles, much like red-eared sliders (Trachemys scripta elegans), have also been collected for the pet trade.

Gallery

References

Further reading
Conant, R. (1975). A Field Guide to Reptiles and Amphibians of Eastern and Central North America, Second Edition. Houghton Mifflin. Boston. xviii + 429 pp. + 48 plates.  (hardcover),  (paperback). (Graptemys pseudogeographica, pp. 57–58 + Plate 8 + Map 14.)
Ernst, C.H., J.E. Lovich and R.W. Barbour. (1994). Turtles of the United States and Canada. Smithsonian Institution Press. Washington, District of Columbia.
Gray, J.E. (1831). Synopsis Reptilium; or Short Descriptions of the Species of Reptiles. Part I.—Cataphracta. Tortoises, Crocodiles, and Enaliosaurians. Treuttel, Wurz, and Co. London. viii + 85 pp. + 11 plates. (Emys pseudogeographica, p. 31.)
Smith, H.M., and E.D. Brodie Jr. (1982). Reptiles of North America: A Guide to Field Identification. Golden Press. New York. 240 pp.  (paperback). (Graptemys pseudogeographica, pp. 50–51.)

External links
 Graptemys pseudogeographica , Illinois Natural History Survey
 False Map Turtle, Reptiles and Amphibians of Iowa
 Graptemys pseudogeographica, The Reptile Database

Graptemys
Turtles of North America
Reptiles of the United States
Reptiles described in 1831
Taxa named by John Edward Gray